Mountain Crest High School (MCHS) is a four-year public high school in the western United States, located in Hyrum, Utah. Established in 1983 as part of the Cache County School District, its campus is in the southeast part of Hyrum, a city in the Southern part of Cache County. Mountain Crest High is currently in the Utah High School Activities Association (UHSAA) class 4A Region 11 and its mascot is a mustang. The school was split for the 2016-2017 school year after the completion of Ridgeline High School; new boundaries were drawn and a portion of the student body and faculty were assigned to the new school.  Students residing in the cities and towns of Hyrum, Wellsville, Mendon, Petersboro, Paradise, Avon, and Mount Sterling are within its geographical jurisdiction.

Academics
Mountain Crest incorporates classes from Bridgerland Technical College. These classes are only available to juniors and seniors. In the mornings and afternoons, these classes take up two hours and count as one full class credit instead of the normal .5 credit assigned for classes.

Mountain Crest has a Model United Nations team, which took the top two awards at the Regional High School Model United Nations 2007.  Mountain Crest's Scholastic Olympiad team also places in competition every year.

Athletics

Mountain Crest is a member of the Utah High School Activities Association (UHSAA) and competes in Class 4A, Region XI. Starting in the 2023-2024 school year, Mountain Crest will compete in 26 UHSAA-sanctioned sports, thirteen for boys, and thirteen for girls, that are played throughout the year.  They are:

Fall sports

Winter sports

Spring sports

Football

From 1983 through the end of the 2022 season, the Mustang football team has compiled an overall record of 261-183-0 (.588).  This includes a regular season record of 210-153-0 (.579) and a playoff record of 51-30 (.630). Over 40 seasons, Mountain Crest has qualified for the state playoffs 33 times. However, as of the 2019 football season, every team qualifies for the state playoffs.  They won the state championship in 1987, 2001 and 2005 and were runners-up in 1991, 1992, 2010, 2012 and 2017.  In addition, Mountain Crest has made it to the semi-finals of the state tournament on eight other occasions (1986, 1990, 1994, 2000, 2007, 2008, 2009, and 2022) in which they subsequently did not advance to the final.  Mountain Crest has played Sky View High School of Smithfield, Utah every year since Mountain Crest opened.  The Mustangs have a 23-19 (.548) record over the Sky View Bobcats, including a state championship victory in 1987.

State championships

References

External links
 School homepage
 School District homepage
 

Public high schools in Utah
Educational institutions established in 1983
Schools in Cache County, Utah
1983 establishments in Utah